É Proibido Fumar is the third album recorded by the Brazilian singer Roberto Carlos. Released in 1964 and produced by Evandro Ribeiro, the album includes some of the hits of the singer, such as "É proibido fumar" (later covered by Brazilian rock band Skank) and "O calhambeque".

Track listing

Personnel
Roberto Carlos: vocals
The Youngsters: many instruments

References

1964 albums
Roberto Carlos (singer) albums
Portuguese-language albums
Columbia Records albums